Tottenhill is a civil parish in the English county of Norfolk.
For the purposes of local government, it falls within the district of King's Lynn and West Norfolk.

The villages name means 'Totta's hill'.

Notes

External links

King's Lynn and West Norfolk
Villages in Norfolk
Civil parishes in Norfolk